Raju Bhatt (full name Rajendra Ramprasad Bhatt; died 24 August 2006) was an Indian cricketer. He was a right-handed batsman and wicket-keeper who played for Baroda. He was born in Baroda.

Career
Bhatt made his cricketing debut for Baroda Schools in 1957–58, playing further matches for West Zone Schools and Maharaja Sayajirao University of Baroda prior to his first-class debut.

Bhatt made his first-class debut during the 1961–62 season, against Bombay. He played two matches in the 1961-62 Ranji Trophy.

In the next season, he made a top score of 43 runs, though he weakened in 1963–64, making a top score of 8 runs.

His top score came during his penultimate season, 1965–66, his only first-class half-century, against Gujarat - coming eleven months after a half-century for Baroda University.

Bhatt had to wait over a year for his final two first-class appearances, the last of which finished in an innings defeat for the side.

External links
Raju Bhatt at CricketArchive 

2006 deaths
Indian cricketers
Baroda cricketers
Year of birth missing
Wicket-keepers